Khvor Chah or Khvorchah or Khur Chah may refer to:
 Khvorchah, Bandar Abbas
 Khvor Chah, Bandar Lengeh